Çayköy is a village in the Hamamözü District, Amasya Province, Turkey. Its population is 114 (2021).

References

Villages in Hamamözü District